Anthony Dawson is an Australian-American former professional tennis player.

Dawson, born and raised in Sydney, played collegiate tennis in the United States for Oklahoma City University during the early 1970s. He featured twice in the singles main draw of the Australian Open and made the doubles second round of the 1972 Wimbledon Championships. In 1975 he had an upset win over Tom Gorman at a Houston WCT tournament.

Now living in Texas, Dawson competes on the ITF senior's circuit as an American.

References

External links
 
 

Year of birth missing (living people)
Living people
Australian male tennis players
Tennis players from Sydney
Australian emigrants to the United States
Oklahoma City Stars men's tennis players